American - That's All is a 1917 American silent comedy film directed by Arthur Rosson and starring Jack Devereaux, Winifred Allen and Walter Walker.

Cast
 Jack Devereaux as Monte Boggs
 Winifred Allen as Hazel Stanley
 Walter Walker as Father Boggs
 Blanche Davenport as Mother Boggs
 John Raymond as His Grace
 Charles Mussett as Butler
 Georges Renavent as Lounge Lizard 
 Miss Cummins as Lady Vere de Vere

References

Bibliography
 Phillips, Alastair & Vincendeau, Ginette. Journeys of Desire: European Actors in Hollywood. British Film Institute, 2006.

External links
 

1917 films
1917 comedy films
1910s English-language films
American silent feature films
Silent American comedy films
American black-and-white films
Triangle Film Corporation films
Films directed by Arthur Rosson
1910s American films